Davos railway station may refer to one of several railway stations in Davos, Switzerland:
Davos Platz railway station
on the Landquart–Davos Platz line:
Davos Laret railway station
Davos Wolfgang railway station
Davos Dorf railway station
on the Davos Platz–Filisur line:
Davos Frauenkirch railway station
Davos Glaris railway station
Davos Monstein railway station
Davos Wiesen railway station